Firby may refer to:

Firby, Hambleton, historically in the North Riding, south of Bedale, North Yorkshire, England
Firby, Ryedale, historically in the East Riding, south-west of Malton, North Yorkshire, England
Firby (surname)
SS Firby, a ship wrecked in September 1939

See also 
Fearby, a village south-west of Firby, Hambleton, UK
Furby, a toy